Something About A Dragon? is the first compilation album by gothic rock band One-Eyed Doll. It was released on 1 December 2012.
The album features some new songs as well as some of Kimberly Freeman's solo work

Track listing 

Notes
Tracks 1-3, 11 are new songs
Tracks 4, 6 and 7 have been previously released
Tracks 5, 8-10 are from Kimberly Freeman's solo work

Personnel 

Kimberly Freeman Vocals and Guitar 
Junior Drums, Bass and Synth 
Special Guest: 
W. James Steck II Bass on Scorpion Death

Produced and Mixed by Jason Rufuss Sewell 
Mastered by Eric Broyhill Monsterlab Audio

References 

2012 albums